ISO/IEC JTC 1/SC 28 Office equipment is a standardization subcommittee of the Joint Technical Committee ISO/IEC JTC 1 of the International Organization for Standardization (ISO) and the International Electrotechnical Commission (IEC), that develops and facilitates international standards, technical reports, and technical specifications within the field of office equipment and products, and systems composed of combinations of office equipment. The group's main focus lies within the area of printers and copiers. The international secretariat of ISO/IEC JTC 1/SC 28 is the Japanese Industrial Standards Committee (JISC) located in Japan.

History
ISO/IEC JTC 1/SC 28 was established in 1989 at the JTC 1's second Plenary in Paris, France. The creation of the subcommittee came as a result of the proposal for a subcommittee on office equipment that was submitted by Japan, and accepted by JTC 1. At this plenary, the scope of ISO/IEC JTC 1/SC 28 was agreed upon, and has remained the scope of the subcommittee throughout its history.  The initial secretariat of ISO/IEC JTC 1/SC 28 was the Swiss Association for Standardization (SNV), located in Switzerland. However, in 1997, the Brazilian National Standards Organization (ABNT), located in Brazil, became the new secretariat. In October 2002, the secretariat position was succeeded by JISC.

Scope
The scope of ISO/IEC JTC 1/SC 28 is “Standardization of basic characteristics, test methods and other related items, excluding such interfaces as user system interfaces, communication interfaces and protocols, of office equipment and products such as Printers, Copying Equipments, Digital scanners, Facsimile equipment and systems composed of combinations of office equipment”.

Structure
ISO/IEC JTC 1/SC 28 is made up of one advisory group, ISO/IEC JTC 1/SC 28/AG, and four active working groups (WGs), each of which carries out specific tasks in standards development within the field of office equipment. Working groups can be disbanded if the group's working area is no longer applicable to standardization needs, or established if new working areas arise. The focus of each working group is described in the group's terms of reference. Active working groups of ISO/IEC JTC 1/SC 28 are:

Collaborations
ISO/IEC JTC 1/SC 28 works in close collaboration with a number of other organizations or subcommittees, both internal and external to ISO or IEC, in order to avoid conflicting or duplicative work. Organizations internal to ISO or IEC that collaborate with or are in liaison to ISO/IEC JTC 1/SC 28 include:
 ISO/IEC JTC 1, Information technology
 ISO/TC 6, Paper, board and pulps
 ISO/TC 42, Photography
 ISO/TC 130, Graphic technology
 ISO/TC 130/WG 2, Prepress data exchange
 ISO/TC 130/WG 3, Process control and related metrology
 ISO/TC 171, Document management applications
 ISO/TC 171/SC 1, Quality
 ISO/TC 171/SC 2, Application issues
 IEC TC 100/TA 2, Audio, video, and multimedia systems and equipment; Colour measurement and management

Some organizations external to ISO or IEC that collaborate with or are in liaison to ISO/IEC JTC 1/SC 28, include:
 International Commission on Illumination (CIE); CIE Division 1 and 8
 Ecma International, TC 38
 International Color Consortium (ICC)
 World Meteorological Organization (WMO)

Member countries
Countries pay a fee to ISO to be members of subcommittees.

The 11 "P" (participating) members of ISO/IEC JTC 1/SC 28 are: Austria, China, Germany, Italy, Japan, Republic of Korea, Netherlands, Philippines, Russian Federation, United Kingdom, and United States of America.

The 21 "O" (observing) members of ISO/IEC JTC 1/SC 28 are: Argentina, Belgium, Bosnia and Herzegovina, Czech Republic, Finland, France, Ghana, Hungary, India, Indonesia, Islamic Republic of Iran, Kazakhstan, Kenya, Malaysia, Poland, Romania, Saudi Arabia, Serbia, South Africa, Switzerland, and Thailand.

Published standards
ISO/IEC JTC 1/SC 28 currently has 50 published standards within the field of office equipment, including:

See also
 ISO/IEC JTC 1
 List of ISO standards
 Japanese Industrial Standards Committee
 International Organization for Standardization
 International Electrotechnical Commission

References

External links 
 ISO/IEC JTC 1/SC 28 home page at ISO
 ISO/IEC JTC 1/SC 28 page at ISO

028